Olena Boytsun (born 22 March 1983) is a university graduate and chess master from Ukraine. She has an MA in International Economics, having graduated from the Dnipropetrovsk National University. She is currently doing research for her PhD on "The effects of financial globalization on developing countries".

Boytsun has been playing chess since her childhood. Her current title is Woman International Master. For the last four years she has been cooperating with Internet and regular newspapers, writing mainly (but not only) about economics. Boytsun is a regular contributor to the ChessBase news page .

External links

1983 births
Living people
Ukrainian female chess players
Chess Woman International Masters
Oles Honchar Dnipro National University alumni